Patrick Raymond Fugit (born October 27, 1982) is an American actor.  He has appeared in the films Almost Famous (2000), White Oleander (2002), Spun (2003), Saved! (2004) and Wristcutters: A Love Story (2006), and portrayed Kyle Barnes in the Cinemax series Outcast. He also played Owen in The Last of Us Part II.

Early life 
Fugit was born in Salt Lake City, Utah and lived briefly in Danbury, New Hampshire. His mother, Jan Clark-Fugit, is a dance teacher, and his father, Bruce Fugit, is an electrical engineer. Fugit is the oldest of three children: he has a younger sister and a younger brother. Fugit attended East High School. He appeared in a school production of The Twelve Dancing Princesses as the shoemaker when he was in seventh grade. He has been a skateboarder since he was fifteen.

Career 
Fugit's career launched when he was cast as the young rock-fan-turned-reporter in Cameron Crowe's Almost Famous. Fugit said that he did not have any knowledge of 1970s rock music before starting the music-laden project.

Fugit played an aspiring comic book artist in White Oleander (2002) and a naive drug addict in the dark comedy Spun (2003). 

His next film, Saved! (2004), was a satirical look at the religious right in high schools. Fugit's character was originally a surfer, but it changed into a skateboarder due to his skateboarding experience. 

Fugit starred in The Amateurs and played Evra Von in Cirque du Freak: The Vampire's Assistant (2009). 

In 2011, Fugit was cast in We Bought A Zoo, another Cameron Crowe movie.

In 2016, he joined the cast of Cinemax's television series Outcast. He stated he enjoyed playing a father but worried that not being one in real life at the time might make him seem awkward.  

In 2020, Fugit was cast in a lead role on ABC's pilot for Thirtysomething(else), a sequel to Thirtysomething; however, the pilot was scrapped by ABC later that same year.

Personal life 
Fugit and his best friend, David Fetzer, formed a folk rock band, Mushman, in which Fugit played the guitar and sometimes sang. Fetzer died in 2012. Fugit studies flamenco guitar, which he played on the Cavedoll song "Mayday" and the Mushman song "Brennan's Theme" for the ending scene in Wristcutters: A Love Story. 

Growing up in Salt Lake City, Fugit says he was "the weird kid" in school because he learned ballet as his mother was a ballet teacher and because he was not Mormon but attended a predominantly Mormon school.
Fugit has a child with his long-term partner, actress Jennifer Del Rosario.

Filmography

Film

Television

Video games

References

External links 

1982 births
20th-century American male actors
21st-century American male actors
American male film actors
American male television actors
American male voice actors
American skateboarders
Living people
Male actors from Salt Lake City